Desmond Napoles (born 2007) is an American child drag performer known by the stage name Desmond is Amazing.

Be Amazing: A History of Pride, a children's picture book with text by Napoles and illustrations by Dylan Glynn, was published in June 2020. 

In a March 2023 interview, Napoles said that they were retiring their drag persona and had instead begun working on a line of skin care products.

References

External links
 2017 interview in Out

2007 births
21st-century LGBT people
American drag queens
living people